Lokomotiv was an ice hockey team in Yaroslavl, Russia. They played in the VHL, the second level of Russian ice hockey. It was a farm club of Lokomotiv Yaroslavl of the Kontinental Hockey League. It was founded for the 2011-12 season after the entire KHL team, along with its coaching staff, died in the 2011 Lokomotiv Yaroslavl plane crash and consisted of MHL players of Loko Yaroslavl. When the franchise rejoined the KHL in its 2012–13 season, it was decided to keep a minor team in the VHL structure.

In 2013, Lokomotiv Yaroslavl decided not to allow its team to participate in the VHL for the 2013–14 season. Therefore, Lokomotiv's VHL club was disbanded.

External links
Official site
Team profile on eurohockey.com

Ice hockey teams in Russia
Sport in Yaroslavl
Ice hockey clubs established in 2011
2011 establishments in Russia
Ice hockey clubs disestablished in 2013